Agapostemon melliventris, the honey-tailed striped-sweat bee, is a species of sweat bee in the family Halictidae.

References

Further reading

External links

 

melliventris
Articles created by Qbugbot
Insects described in 1874